MZO may refer to:
 Sierra Maestra Airport which uses the IATA airport code MZO
 Ministry of Science and Education (Croatia) which uses acronym MZO in Croatian for Ministarstvo znanosti i obrazovanja